Let's Be Perverts (변태가 되자 Byeontae ga Toeja) is a manhwa series created by Lee You-jung (이유정).

The series follows the life of the 17-year-old Perverto, who always encounters the unavoidable nickname "pervert" (변태 byeontae, which translates into Japanese as 変態 hentai). Contrary to this nickname, Perverto is actually quite naïve when it comes to sexual matters.
Perverto transfers to a new school to escape the epithet, but his new math teacher revives it at the new school.

External links
 
 Let's Be Perverts at NET COMICS

Humor comics
Manhwa titles